Mile High Pinball is a late 2005 pinball video game developed by Ideaworks3D and published by Nokia for the Nokia N-Gage.

Gameplay

Unlike most pinball games, the object of Mile High Pinball is not to score points. Instead, players must keep bouncing their ball higher and higher, into different pinball tables. Players also cannot "lose" balls by missing them with the paddles and letting them fall - instead, if a player fails to successfully hit the ball, they drop down one level. There are also positive and negative powerups on the tables that players may pick up to boost or reduce their abilities. In addition, players collect a form of currency that they can use to buy items in the store.

Multiplayer, however, does use a points system. In ranked matches, finishing a round with the most points gives you one ranking point, which is tracked and published to a leader board, showing the highest ranked players.

Reception

Mile High Pinball received "favorable" reviews according to the review aggregation website Metacritic.

References

External links
 Official Mile High Pinball webpage on N-Gage.com

N-Gage games
2005 video games
Pinball video games
Video games developed in the United Kingdom
Nokia games
Multiplayer and single-player video games